Mildenhall Stadium is a speedway, stock car racing and Greyhound Board of Great Britain regulated greyhound racing venue located in Mildenhall, Suffolk between Cambridge and Norwich. The stadium is known as Suffolk Downs when greyhound racing takes place.

The stadium has a Race View Restaurant and a fish and chip shop as well as the Fen Men bar licensed bar. There is a second licensed bar underneath the home straight grandstand. Speedway is held on Sundays (April to October).

Origins and opening 
Mildenhall is in an area with strong coursing roots and in later decades greyhound racing became a popular sport too. The market town in Suffolk is surrounded by agricultural land with the only significant landmark near the town being RAF Mildenhall, a Royal Air Force station that opened in 1934. It would take another 37 years before the area experienced speedway.

History

Speedway

In 1971 a speedway practice track was built on farmland owned by Terry Waters and two years later on the same farmland the track was moved to the south side of the junction where Hayland Drove meets Cooks Drove. The track was extremely primitive with a few sheds used as dressing rooms and straw bales made up the safety fence. In 1975 the Mildenhall Fen Tigers were formed and they entered the National League.

Greyhound racing

In August 1990, Dick Partridge approached Terry Waters regarding a return for speedway and the introduction of greyhound racing. A lease was agreed and the greyhound track was constructed along with improvements in the facilities including new concrete terracing and track lights. The hare was an 'Outside Sumner' and the sand that made the surface was the King's Lynn silica sand. Seventy-four kennels were constructed with a paddock and weighing room added in an area of the old speedway pits. After securing a licence from the National Greyhound Racing Club the first meeting took place on Saturday 21 September 1991. An eight race card started with a 375 metres event that was won by Coppacabana a 3-1 shot trained by Mills in a time of 24.61 secs.

The stadium suffered a two-month closure in the early part of 1992 before re-opening under new management headed by Denis Diffley. In 1995 Terry Waters took over from Dick Partridge who suffered financial difficulties.

One of the sports leading trainers Linda Jones from nearby Lakenheath attended the track regularly whilst establishing the Imperial Kennels. Tuesday and Saturday night racing became regular nights with other race distances in addition to 375 being 550 & 700 metres.

Later the greyhound racing was then overseen by Richard Borthwick and Michael Glynn and new Racing Manager was Michael Hill. Mildenhall underwent changes again with distances being fine-tuned to 220, 375, 545, 700, 870 & 1025 metres on a circumference of 325m. Terry Waters took over as General Manager at the turn of the millennium and in 2008 Dave and Ron Coventry took over followed by Richard Borthwick.

Controversy and sale
In 2006, a couple bought a house close to Mildenhall Stadium where stock car racing and speedway have taken place since 1975, and began complaining about the noise. The couple took the stadium to court in 2014 and won resulting in the threat of closure for the stadium. In between the track experienced a temporary suspension following the exit of promoter Carl Harris. In 2016, the stadium was sold to Deane Wood of Spedeworth Motorsports.

Greyhound racing closure and return
Greyhound racing was held every Tuesday and Friday night (all year round) but on 15 January 2018 it was announced that the racing would cease. With the ongoing problems experienced by the track, the majority of its biggest trainers left for Crayford Stadium, Henlow Stadium and Harlow Stadium, which resulted in racing only being held one night per week before the closure. In 2020, Kevin Boothby (the Towcester promoter) announced the return of racing and renamed the stadium Suffolk Downs. The first trial session took place on 12 January 2022.

When racing returned the first meeting was held on 8 February 2022, with the primary race distance being 388 metres.

Current track records

Former track records

References

Stock car racing venues
Greyhound racing venues in the United Kingdom
Sports venues in Suffolk
Speedway venues in England
Mildenhall, Suffolk